Hippolito Salviani (1514–1572) was an Italian physician, scholar and naturalist, noted for his Renaissance book Aquatilium animalium historiae, depicting about hundred Mediterranean fish species, some from Illyria, and a few mollusks. He also wrote works on medicine, such as that dealing with Galen's theory of crises, and a topical play. Salviani taught at the University of Rome until 1568. From 1550 until 1555 he was chief physician to the House of Farnese and three successive popes, Pope Julius III, Pope Marcellus II and Pope Paul IV.

Salviani was born in Città di Castello. He studied medicine, developing a great interest in ichthyology and in natural history generally. He enjoyed the financial support of Cardinal Cervini (later Pope Marcellus II), enabling him to explore the Mediterranean coastline. Cervini's death caused Salviani to dedicate the work to Pope Paul IV.

Aristotle's work on fish species is one of the earliest known. In the 1500s fish enjoyed a renewed interest in both France and Italy. 1551 saw the appearance of Pierre Belon’s Histoire naturelle des estranges poissons marins, illustrated by woodcuts. In 1554 Guillaume Rondelet’s De piscibus marinis was published, also using woodcuts. Salviani’s work was published in parts over a period of three years. Its use of copper engraving was well-suited to depicting fish, and greatly superior to woodcuts with its lifelike rendition of eyes and scales. The copper engravings have a scientific appearance, but some details, like the correct number and position of the scales were omitted. Nicolas Béatrizet probably designed the title-page and the fish illustrations were made by Antoine Lafréry. Another theory is that they were drawn by the Italian painter Bernardus Aretinus and engraved by Nicolas Béatrizet. Salviani's Aquatilium animalium historiae (1554-1558) only deals with animals personally observed and handled by him. He noted that cephalopods were distinct from fishes. He collected most of the fishes for his studies from the market in Rome.

Salviani died in Rome, aged about 58.

References

External links

 Aquatilium animalium historiae. Liber primus cum eorumdem formis aere excusis. Rome, 1554.

1514 births
1572 deaths
People from Città di Castello
Italian naturalists
16th-century Italian physicians
Italian scholars
Italian ichthyologists